Car boot sales or boot fairs are a form of market in which private individuals come together to sell household and garden goods. They are popular in the United Kingdom, where they are often referred to simply as 'car boots'.

Some scientific research has studied people's shopping habits at car boot sales. These groups of scientists see the rotation of surplus household stock as essential as it prevents waste and disposal costs, and also produces a small community where thriftiness and entrepreneurship flourish.

The term "car boot sale" refers to the selling of items from a car's boot. Although a small proportion of sellers are professional traders selling goods, or indeed browsing for items to buy, most of the goods on sale are used personal possessions. Car boot sales are a way of attracting a large group of people in one place to recycle useful but unwanted domestic items that otherwise might have been thrown away. Car boot sales generally take place in the summer months. However, in a growing trend, indoor boot sales, and all-year hard-standing outdoor boot sales, are now appearing in some parts of the UK. Items for sale are extremely varied, including for example antiques and collectables, as in a flea market. Car boot sales are also very popular in parts of Australia, and have a growing presence in mainland Europe.

Locations
Car boot sales are held in a variety of locations, including the grounds of schools and other community buildings, or in grass fields or car parks. Usually they take place at a weekend, often on a Sunday. Sellers will typically pay a small fee for their pitch and arrive with their goods in the boot of their car. Usually the items are then unpacked onto folding trestle tables, a blanket or tarpaulin, or the ground. Entry to the general public is usually free, although sometimes a small admission charge is made. Advertised opening times are often not strictly adhered to: often the nature of the venue makes it impossible to prevent keen bargain hunters from wandering in as soon as the first stallholders arrive.

History
It has been said that Father Harry Clarke, a Catholic priest from Stockport, introduced the car boot sale to the UK as a charity fundraiser, after seeing a similar event or trunk fair in Canada, while on holiday there in the early 1970s. Despite the fact that no original source for this has been verified, the story continues to be told. There are now large numbers of regular car boot sales across the UK.

Online
In the 2000s, various "car boot sales" websites were established. These tend to be popular in winter when there are fewer normal outdoor car boot sales.

Safeguards

In 2008, a national charter, Real Deal: Working Together For Fake-Free Markets, was launched by the Trading Standards Institute in England.  It is intended to help local authority Trading Standards staff, market operators and copyright owners.   By signing up to the charter, a market operator commits to work closely with Trading Standards to prevent the sale of counterfeit and other illegal goods, and to be aware of who is trading at the market. Trading Standards will, in return, commit to support the market operator and provide information to them in relation to the sale of infringing products.

Guarantees are rarely sought or given at car boot sales and electrical items can rarely be tested at the sale site. Although tracing a seller can be difficult, in the UK they are still obliged to abide by the Trade Descriptions Act.

See also
 Sales (market fairs): 
 Bazaar
 Charity shop (thrift store)
 Flea market
 Garage sale (yard sale)
 Give-away shop
 Jumble sale

 Networks facilitating trading of used goods: 
 Buy Nothing Project
 The Freecycle Network

References

External links 
 

British culture
Non-store retailing
Retail markets in the United Kingdom
Reuse